Motto is a surname. Notable people with the surname include:

 Jerome Motto (1921–2015), American psychiatrist
 Rocco Motto, Italian entrepreneur and designer

See also
 Motto (disambiguation)
 Motta (surname)